is a 2021 Japanese crime and yakuza film. It is a sequel to the 2018 film The Blood of Wolves.

Premise
In the early 1990s, a young detective Shūichi Hioka controls the yakuza in Hiroshima, but the situation completely changes when Shigehiro Uebayashi is released from prison.

Cast

Tori Matsuzaka as Shūichi Hioka
Ryohei Suzuki as Shigehiro Uebayashi
Nijirō Murakami as Kōta "Chinta" Chikada
Nanase Nishino as Mao Chikada
Takuma Oto'o as Shigeru Yoshida
Taichi Saotome as Masaru Hanada
Kiyohiko Shibukawa as Yukio Amagi
Katsuya Maiguma as Masatoshi Saeki
Miwako Kakei as Chiaki Kanbara
Sho Aoyagi as Ken'ichi Kanbara
Kenichi Yajima as Keiji Tomotake
Hiroki Miyake as Satoru Nakagami
Yoshiko Miyazaki as Yuriko Seshima
Ryuji Sainei as Kikuchi
Ryūji Bando
Yumiko Udo
Rairu Sugita
Issei Okihara as Arihara
Urara Anryū as Kakutani's wife
Motohiro Oguri as Tokura
Takumi Saitoh as Yūma Tachibana
Nakamura Baijaku II as Takayuki Seshima
Kenichi Takitō as Daisuke Saga
Susumu Terajima as Yōji Kakutani
Takashi Ukaji as Akira Mizoguchi
Rino Katase as Tamaki Irako
Nakamura Shidō II as Takafumi Kōsaka
Kōtarō Yoshida as Yōzō Watafune

Awards
{| class="wikitable sortable"
|-
! Award
! Category
! Nominee
! Result
|-
| rowspan="5"|46th Hochi Film Awards
| Best Picture 
| Last of the Wolves
| 
|-
| Best Director 
| Kazuya Shiraishi
| 
|-
| Best Actor 
| Tori Matsuzaka
| 
|-
| Best Supporting Actor
| Ryohei Suzuki
| 
|-
| Best Supporting Actress
| Nanase Nishino
| 
|-
| rowspan="3"|34th Nikkan Sports Film Awards
| Best Film
| Last of the Wolves
| 
|-
|Best Actor
| Tori Matsuzaka
| 
|-
| Best Supporting Actor 
| Ryohei Suzuki
| 
|-
| rowspan="2"|43rd Yokohama Film Festival
| Best Actor
| Tori Matsuzaka
| 
|-
| Best Supporting Actor
| Ryohei Suzuki
| 
|-
| rowspan="4"|76th Mainichi Film Awards
| rowspan="2"| Best Supporting Actor
| Ryohei Suzuki
| 
|-
| Nijiro Murakami
| 
|-
| Best Art Direction
| Tsutomu Imamura
| 
|-
| Best Sound Recording
| Kazuharu Urata
| 
|- 
| 95th Kinema Junpo Awards
| Best Supporting Actor
| Ryohei Suzuki
| 
|-
| 17th Osaka Cinema Festival 
| Best Supporting Actor
| Ryohei Suzuki
| 
|-
| rowspan="4"|64th Blue Ribbon Awards
| Best Film
| Last of the Wolves
| 
|-
| Best Director
| Kazuya Shiraishi
| 
|-
| Best Actor
| Tori Matsuzaka
| 
|-
| Best Supporting Actor
| Ryohei Suzuki
| 
|-
| rowspan="14"|45th Japan Academy Film Prize
| Picture of the Year
| Last of the Wolves
| 
|-
| Best Director
| Kazuya Shiraishi
| 
|-
| Best Actor
| Tori Matsuzaka
| 
|-
| rowspan="2" |Best Supporting Actor
| Ryohei Suzuki
| 
|-
| Nijiro Murakami
| 
|-
| Best Supporting Actress
| Nanase Nishino
| 
|-
| Best Screenplay
| Jun'ya Ikegami
| 
|-
| Best Music 
| Gorō Yasukawa
| 
|-
| Best Cinematography 
| Kohei Kato
| 
|-
| Best Lighting Direction 
| Minoru Kawai
| 
|-
| Best Art Direction 
| Tsutomu Imamura
| 
|-
| Best Sound Recording 
| Kazuharu Urata
| 
|-
| Best Film Editing
| Hitomi Katō
| 
|- 
| Newcomer of the Year
| Nanase Nishino
| 
|-
| 31st Japan Movie Critics Awards
| Best Supporting Actor
| Ryohei Suzuki
| 
|- 
| rowspan="2" | 75th MPTE- Imaging Technology Awards
| Best Cinematography 
| Kohei Kato
| 
|-
| Best Lighting Direction 
| Minoru Kawai
|

References

External links

2021 crime films
2021 drama films
2021 crime drama films
2020s Japanese films
2020s Japanese-language films
Films based on Japanese novels
Films directed by Kazuya Shiraishi
Films set in the 1990s
Japanese crime drama films
Toei Company films
Yakuza films